Kaja Horst Haugseng (born 23 September 2001) is a Norwegian handball player who plays for Sola HK in REMA 1000-ligaen and the Norwegian national team.

She made her debut on the Norwegian national team on 21 April 2022, against North Macedonia.

Achievements
Norwegian League
 Bronze: 2021/2022
Norwegian Cup
 Silver: 2022/2023

References

2001 births
Living people
Norwegian female handball players
Sportspeople from Stavanger
21st-century Norwegian women